"Down in Atlanta" is a song written and performed by American musicians Pharrell Williams and Travis Scott. Produced by the former, it was released as a single through Columbia Records on November 18, 2022. It also serves as Scott's first official release as a lead artist in a little over a year, following the release of the late 2021 singles "Escape Plan" and "Mafia" (although he had been featured on a few songs in 2022). Both artists have collaborated before when Williams contributed production to Scott's 2015 song, "Flying High", and provided guest vocals on his 2018 song, "Skeletons".

Background and promotion
In late August 2022, Williams and Scott were spotted together in a recording studio. The song was first teased a few weeks later and then kept on being teased, and Scott also performed a portion of it live at his "Road to Utopia" residency in Las Vegas. On October 31, 2022, Williams announced that the song would be released four days later, which was however delayed by two weeks for unknown reasons.

Composition and lyrics
Over funk-led production from Williams, Scott sings: "I told shawty to bring the wave / You know life's a beach / She said, 'Life's a bitch' / Let’s hit Magic City". The "spooky production" includes "sly, retro synths", Scott name-drops celebrities from the city of Atlanta in the state of Georgia, while he also boasts about the expensive cars he owns. Jason Lipshutz of Billboard felt that Scott "mixes zonked-out warbling with tales of luxury and fills each line with his larger-than-life persona – while the multi-hyphenate focuses on making each drum-and-synth interaction tingle the listener's senses".

Credits and personnel
 Pharrell Williams – production, songwriting, background vocals
 Travis Scott – vocals, songwriting
 Manny Marroquin – mixing
 Michelle Mancini – mastering
 Mike Larson – recording
 Anthony Vilchis – engineering assistance
 Trey Station – engineering assistance
 Zach Pereyra – engineering assistance

Charts

References

2022 singles
2022 songs
Pharrell Williams songs
Travis Scott songs
Songs written by Pharrell Williams
Songs written by Travis Scott
Song recordings produced by Pharrell Williams
Columbia Records singles